The Burly Bear Network was an American cable TV channel targeted at 18- to 24-year-old college students founded in 1994. The company was created by four friends from Connecticut, Danny Stein, Brian Nurenberg, Danny Ameri and James Mairs and led by CEO Stein. Programming was offered on some university TV stations, including Arizona State University, Louisiana State University, Ball State University, Iowa State University, Northern Kentucky University, Purdue University, the University of Dayton, the University of Missouri, Berry College, Michigan State University, and Indiana University East in Richmond, as well as late nights on TBS.

The Network was a privately held company, under CEO Danny Stein, who ran the company while Ameri and Mairs led production and Nurenberg led distribution. The Company become the premier college entertainment television network, ultimately passing 8 million college students at hundreds of colleges and universities in the United States. The network also included an events business that brought its branded entertainment to campuses and through online exploits at the dawn of the commercial internet boom. 

Stein led a sale to Lorne Michael's Broadway Video in May 1997, and then departed in 1999 after the company was integrated into Broadway Video. Howard Handler was hired in 1999 as CEO with Ted Jessup as the head of programming. In September 2002, the company was bought by National Lampoon for an undisclosed amount. This sale corresponded to the end of programming on TBS. The network folded into National Lampoon Network around September 2002.

Programs

Some programming included

Half Baked (1997 – 2002)
National Rage Page (aka NPR) (1997 – 2000)
Shredder's Way (1997)
Break This (1998)
Expedition (1998)
The Kids in the Hall (1998 – 2002)
Tame Show (Hosted by Jodi Lennon, celeb interviews, undercover camera, sketches) (1998 – 2000)
Burlyvision (2000 – 2001)
Crash Pad (2000)
The Henry Brothers (2000 – 2001)
Shock Therapy (2000)
Laarr's Lounge (2000)
No Cover (2000)
Press Junky (off-beat celeb interviews & movie reviews) (2000)
Shuffle (2000)
Stripped Down (2000)
Thrillavision (2000)
Kevin Spencer (both the original shorts and full-length series) (2000)
Dave and Steve's Video Game Explosion
Celebrity Highway
Shuffle (a music magazine show)
Burlyvision (student and independent short films)
Imposter (pranks and hidden cameras)
Overkill! (extreme sports)
Sexology (relationships)

Network Promos 
The commercials and promo videos for the Burly Bear Network were created and produced by Mike Henry and Patrick Henry, whose other work included the FOX television series Family Guy, American Dad! and The Cleveland Show.

External links
Internet Movie Database listing

References

Defunct television networks in the United States
Television channels and stations established in 1994
Television channels and stations disestablished in 2002
1994 establishments in the United States
2002 disestablishments in the United States